is a Japanese actress. She was born in Saitama and is affiliated with Himawari Theatre Group.

Biography

Filmography

Television animation
 Ghost in the Shell: Stand Alone Complex (2002) - Moe
 Aishiteruze Baby (2004) - Yuzuyu Sakashita
 Mushishi (2005) - Aya (younger - episode 17); Tanyuu (younger - episode 20)

OVA
 Final Fantasy VII Advent Children (2005) - Marlene Wallace

Theatrical animation
 Colorful (2010)

Dubbing
 Signs – Bo Hess (Abigail Breslin)
 The Sound of Music (50th Anniversary edition) – Marta (Debbie Turner)
 Stanley – Mimi & Marci

References

External links
 

1994 births
Living people
Japanese child actresses
Japanese video game actresses
Japanese voice actresses
Voice actresses from Saitama Prefecture